Central Belters  is a compilation album by Scottish post-rock band Mogwai, released on 23 October 2015 by Rock Action Records. It is a career retrospective of the band's work to mark their 20th anniversary, and contains highlights from the band's career, non-album singles, and some rarities. The title refers to the Central Belt of Scotland, from where the group originated. The album reached number 40 on the UK Albums Chart and was met with critical acclaim.

Critical reception

Central Belters was met with widespread critical acclaim. At Metacritic, which assigns a normalised rating out of 100 to reviews from mainstream critics, the album received an average score of 85, based on 11 reviews, indicating "universal acclaim".

Track listing

Charts

References

Mogwai compilation albums
2015 compilation albums
Rock Action Records albums